The 2020–21 season is the 118th season of Bradford City and the second consecutive season in EFL League Two, Along with League Two, the club will also participate in the FA Cup, EFL Cup and EFL Trophy.

The season covers the period from 1 July 2020 to 30 June 2021.

Pre-season

On 18 August 2020, Bradford faced Doncaster Rovers in a behind closed doors friendly, the Bantams lost the match 4–3 with Kurtis Guthrie scoring a brace of goals with another one added by Billy Clarke. Two days later it was announced that Bradford would face local rivals Huddersfield Town in a behind closed doors friendly at the Terriers training ground. Later on that week the match against Huddersfield was given the green light to play at Kirklees Stadium. Bradford's final pre-season match ended in a 3–2 defeat at the hands of Wigan Athletic.

Competitions

EFL League Two

League table

Results summary

Results by matchday

Matches

The 2020–21 season fixtures were released on 21 August.

FA Cup

The draw for the first round was made on Monday 26, October. The second round draw was revealed on Monday, 9 November by Danny Cowley.

EFL Cup

The first round draw was made on 18 August, live on Sky Sports, by Paul Merson. The draw for both the second and third round were confirmed on September 6, live on Sky Sports by Phil Babb.

EFL Trophy

The regional group stage draw was confirmed on 18 August.

Squad Statistics

As of 11 May 2021.

Transfers

Transfers in

Loans in

Transfers out

References

Bradford City
Bradford City A.F.C. seasons